SNUB or Stop Norwich UrBanisation is a non-profit organisation based around Norwich, United Kingdom, whose aim is to stop the urbanisation of Norwich and its surrounding villages, such as Rackheath, Salhouse, Wroxham and Postwick.

The work of SNUB has received wide coverage, including national coverage on BBC Radio 4's Farming Today programme
 and in the UK newspaper, the Daily Telegraph. It has also received local coverage on television programmes such as BBC One's Politics Show, BBC One's Look East, ITV's Anglia Tonight and a BBC One Norwich North By-Election Special; and in local newspapers, such as the Eastern Daily Press and the Norwich Evening News.

In March 2012, after a successful legal challenge at the High Court, they announced that the actor Martin Shaw would become their official patron. In a press release, he announced that he was "simply furious and upset by your plight and that of all of us who wish to live in quiet and peace.  I will be your Patron and keep fighting".


Rackheath Eco-town

SNUB have worked alongside many local residents in protesting heavily against the proposed Rackheath Eco-town, as they claim the plans are flawed and will lead to massive overdevelopment of the area.

An official petition on the 10 Downing Street petitions website has also been created by SNUB, and has nearly 300 online signatures (as of June2010), and a paper petition with over 3000 signatures.

SNUB have also organised many public meetings with both Broadland District Council and the local residents who will be effected by the proposals. The first public meeting at Holy Trinity Church, Rackheath, on 17 September 2009 and was featured on BBC One's Look East. The meeting focused on the proposals, and was attended by many hundreds of local residents, as well as a number of senior council officials and councillors, including MP Keith Simpson, Broadland District Council leader Simon Woodbridge, Councillor Andrew Proctor, Chief Planner Phil Kirby, and Councillor Ben McGilvary.

Norwich Northern Distributor Road

SNUB share the views of many residents and businesses of North Norwich, as well as the views of the Campaign for Better Transport in the protest over the Norwich Northern Distributor Road, dubbed the "Road to Nowhere", as it no longer is planned to link up to Taverham and the A47. SNUB say they are very concerned as to the implications for Taverham, RIngland and Costessey as traffic can not join up to the A47 meaning an increase in traffic in these areas and more "rat runs".

References

Non-profit organisations based in the United Kingdom
Organisations based in Norwich
Organizations established in 2010
2010 establishments in England